Shian is one of the neighborhoods in the northeast of Tehran.

Shiyan neighborhood, which is located in district 4 of Tehran, is located in the north of Loizan Forest Park and south of Aja residential and military complex.

The streets of this neighborhood are named Xian and Xian 1 to 7 respectively. Shi'an neighborhood has a Hosseinieh and Loizan Hospital is located near it.

The highway under construction in Darabad is the closest highway to this neighborhood. A forest park named Xian and Xian Hotel are among the sightseeing places of the neighborhood. [1] Xian Village Hotel was built in 1375 by Region 4 Municipality in the northeastern part of Louisan Forest Park.

Lavizan-Shian was an alleged undeclared nuclear site in north-eastern Tehran, Iran. The site was under investigation by the International Atomic Energy Agency (IAEA) as a potential undeclared nuclear site. According to Reuters, claims by the US that topsoil has been removed and the site had been sanitized could not be verified by IAEA investigators who visited Lavizan. In Paragraph 39 of the IAEA's November 2005 report on Iran, the IAEA stated "The information provided by Iran appeared to be coherent and consistent with its explanation of the razing of the Lavisan-Shian area."

External links
No Sign of Nuke Work at Suspect Iran Site - Diplomats
DESTRUCTION AT IRANIAN SITE RAISES NEW QUESTIONS ABOUT IRAN'S NUCLEAR ACTIVITIES
U.N. probe detects uranium in Iran
IAEA Report November 2005

Nuclear research institutes
Nuclear program of Iran